The Optare Solo is a low-floor minibus/midibus with one or two doors manufactured by Optare in the United Kingdom since 1998. The Solo name is a play on its low-floor status, the manufacturer marketing its vehicle as having an entrance that is "so low" from the floor, namely  with kneeling suspension. In January 2012 Optare announced the end of production for the original Solo design with a modified Solo SR taking over.

The original innovative design, featuring a front axle ahead of the entrance door, gained a Millennium product award, along with a Queen's Award for Enterprise. 3,857 original model Solos were built between 1998 and 2012. As of April 2017, almost 1,500 Solo SRs had been built.

Construction 

The Solo is an integral midibus (as opposed to a separate chassis and body) built in a modular design, with steel frame and GRP panels. Detailed analysis and computer modelling of the design and any impacts of stresses it would see in service were undertaken by finite element analysis firm Analysis by Firth, based in Wigan, UK. It is powered by a Mercedes-Benz OM904LA engine, which produces  or  according to specification, and it is typically mated to an Allison 2000 automatic gearbox. Later, the options of a Cummins ISBe 6-cylinder  engine or a MAN engine became available. There was also the option of a 4-speed Allison AT545 gearbox. In 2005 a hybrid Solo was constructed, using a small diesel unit and an Eneco (now known as Traction Technology) battery propulsion unit.

The chassis type code of the Solo denotes the length – M780 corresponds to 7.8m, M850 to 8.5m, and so forth. This is reflected in the chassis code, so a Cummins-powered Solo was coded M810, M880, M950 or M1020.

Along with the launch of the  model, the Solo was also first offered with LED-type rear lights, as opposed to the standard rectangular clusters. Seating capacities range from 25 for an M780, 29 for an M850, 33 for M920 and 37 for an M990.

Original Variants

Slimline 

A narrow-bodied version named the "Slimline" was launched in 2004 with the first examples entering service in August. Available across all lengths except the M990, the Slimline is identified by having an SL-suffix in the chassis code, e.g. The Optare Solo Slimline is a 25-seated low-floor bus to replace the Optare MetroRider.

The compact size of an M780SL, with its seating capacity of 25, has made it a popular choice for replacing earlier-generation minibuses, such as the MCW Metrorider, and other van-based buses.

SE 

In June 2006, Optare announced the arrival of another Solo model – the Solo SE. At just  in length, it is the shortest Solo offered, and is capable of seating 23. It also uses a single-piece entrance door as an option.

The first SE built, the former Optare demonstrator, entered service with Regal Busways, of Essex, in September 2006. The company has since acquired a further four examples.

EV 
In March 2009, Optare launched the all-electric version of the Solo, the Solo EV. Since the summer of 2013, the vehicle uses a high-efficiency MAGTEC P180 Permanent Magnet Motor-Gearbox rated at 150kW and powered by two banks of Valence lithium-ion phosphate batteries. The two packs work in parallel and provide 307V with a total capacity of 92kWh.

Solo+ 
In November 2008 the 'new' Optare unveiled the Solo+ – a completely restyled variant to celebrate ten years of the Solo as a new low-entry bus and was launched at the Euro Bus Expo 2008. It shared the same styling with the Rapta, which was launched at the same show. It sees the return of the flat side windows and roof as well as a steeper front end with an integral destination box. Proposed options include a full electric drive.

However, the plan of producing the Solo+ was dropped afterwards. The new product met with a poor market response and never made it beyond the prototype stage. The further development required to make the product an improvement on previous models was possibly deemed to be too great (and costly), the plans being shelved.

Solo SR 

In October 2007 Optare unveiled the Solo SR at the Coach & Bus Show. It is a completely-restyled version of the Solo drawing styling features from the Versa, such as the curved side windows and sweeping roof (with the destination screen and air conditioning unit underneath). Some features of the Solo such as the curved front windscreen and the unusual chassis layout, with the front wheels ahead of the doorway, were retained. Another new unusual feature to the Solo SR is the lack of a destination box on the standard model. However, Optare offers this as an option to individual customer specification.

In January 2012, Optare announced that the facelifted Solo SR would replace the standard Solo for both UK and export markets, with the standard design being withdrawn from sale.

It was then available in 7.1 m, 7.8 m, 8.9 m and 9.6 m variants, all available in the Slimline (2.35 m wide) version. 8.9 m and 9.6 m models are available in the wider 2.5 m body width. All 2012 Solo SRs feature curved side glazing and high specification interiors allowing up to 37 seats in the longest derivative.

Some of the bodywork components had been redesigned to take advantage of the benefits achieved on the recently released Tempo SR design which reduced both weight and cost and further improve fuel economy.

Hybrid 
The diesel-electric hybrid single-decker bus had room for 53 passengers; its configuration can be changed to provide seating for up to 34 passengers plus one wheelchair with additional standing room. Its peak power demands are met by batteries that are recharged on-board by the diesel generator.

Operators

United Kingdom 

The first Optare Solos entered service in 1998 with Wilts & Dorset, with the operator initially taking on 32 examples to convert its Poole bus services to low-floor operation. The company eventually took on a total of 85 Solos. Arriva, FirstGroup, Go-Ahead Group, Stagecoach Group, Wellglade Group and Travel West Midlands made subsequent orders, with all having operated large fleets. Solos have been operated by Transport for London operators Arriva London, Quality Line, Metrobus and Travel London. Speedwellbus operated some in various liveries. A fleet of over 30 operated by LibertyBus is in use in Jersey. Optare Solos are operated in Northern Ireland by Translink Ulsterbus.

Malta 
In 2011, Arriva Malta purchased nine Optare Solo Hybrid, registered as BUS 267 - BUS 275, for some of its routes in Malta and Gozo. These passed on to Malta Public Transport, but their used declined and, after summer 2015, they sporadically appeared on summer 2016 and summer 2017, before being withdrawn, and some used as staff bus in Floriana.

Moreover, between 2014 and 2015, Malta Public Transport loaned 23 Optare Solo SR, registered as BUS 330 - BUS 352, to increase the carrying capacity. These buses were returned to the United Kingdom in September 2015.

Republic of Ireland 
The Solo Slimline saw frequent use as a localized bus service from Bray, County Wicklow, operated by Finnegan Bray, and throughout the rest of the country by Bus Éireann.

Europe 
Netherlands operator Syntus purchased 25 Solos in 2010. In 2015, Solo EVs were delivered to Karlstad in Sweden. In Hungary, Kapos Volán bought one, which is operating in Siófok.

Asia 
 
In Hong Kong, AMS Public Transport (Chinese: ]) and Koon Wing Motor Limited respectively bought an Optare Solo SR for their public light bus service. Optare Solo SR was the first model of low floor public light bus in use in Hong Kong.

North America 

In the United States, a left hand drive version of the Solo was sold from 2003 to 2005 by North American Bus Industries (which at the time owned Optare) as the 30-LFN. Major purchasers were American Eagle Airlines and Miami-Dade Transit. NABI's sale of Optare coupled with poor sales led to its demise in the US market.

Middle East 
In 2010, four Solos were purchased by Israeli operator Dan Bus Company.

Solo buses were purchased by the RTA in Dubai. Optare was to supply Dubai with 94 buses by quarter one of 2019 with a deal valued at approximately 18m British Pounds.

South Africa 
In 2012, Optare delivered the first of 190 Solo SRs for Cape Town's MyCiTi bus rapid transit system. These were supplied as knock-down kits and assembled locally.

Australasia 
In New Zealand, Reesby Buses imported nine Solo M880s to operate in Rotorua. In Australia, Optare Solos have been purchased by SkyBus, Transdev Melbourne and Ventura Bus Lines in Melbourne, Bus Queensland in Toowoomba and Hamilton Island.

References

External links 

Solo
Electric midibuses
Hybrid electric buses
Low-floor buses
Low-entry buses
Midibuses
Minibuses
Vehicles introduced in 1998
Battery electric buses